Ayusi was a Dzungar officer of the Qing dynasty. He is best known for his achievements against the Dzungar Khanate. His achievements allowed the Qing dynasty to pacify northern Xinjiang.

References

Qing dynasty politicians from Xinjiang
Qing dynasty military personnel
18th-century Chinese people
Chinese people of Mongolian descent